Robert Everton Cushman Jr. (December 24, 1914 – January 2, 1985) was a United States Marine Corps four-star general who served as the 25th commandant of the Marine Corps from January 1, 1972, to June 30, 1975. He was honored for heroism during World War II at the battles of Guam (Navy Cross), Bougainville (Bronze Star Medal) and Iwo Jima (Legion of Merit). He also commanded all Marine forces in the Vietnam War from June to December 1967, and served as deputy director of the Central Intelligence Agency (CIA) from 1969 to 1971.

Early life
Cushman was born December 24, 1914, in St. Paul, Minnesota, the son of Jennie Lind ( Cumley) and Robert Everton Cushman. He attended Central High School and at sixteen, before graduating, was appointed to the United States Naval Academy. Cushman graduated tenth in his class of 442 from the academy.

Marines career

Early career
Cushman was commissioned a second lieutenant in the United States Marine Corps on June 6, 1935. He completed the Basic School for Marine officers at the Philadelphia Navy Yard, then served briefly at the Marine Corps Base, San Diego, California. In February 1936, he arrived in Shanghai, China, and served as a platoon commander with the 4th Marines and later the 2nd Marine Brigade. On his return to the United States in March 1938, he served at naval shipyards in Brooklyn, New York, and Portsmouth, Virginia. He was promoted to first lieutenant in August 1938.

In April 1939, Cushman was assigned to the Marine detachment at the New York World's Fair, and was subsequently stationed at the Marine Barracks, Quantico, Virginia. He was promoted to captain in March 1941.

World War II
In June 1941, Cushman reported aboard  in San Diego, en route to Pearl Harbor, as commanding officer of the ship's Marine detachment. He was serving in this capacity when the Japanese attacked the ship and other naval installations at Pearl Harbor on December 7, 1941. Upon his transfer from the Pennsylvania, he joined the 9th Marine Regiment at San Diego as a battalion executive officer in May 1942 and was promoted to major that same month.

Cushman hiked from San Diego to Camp Pendleton with his unit in September 1942, and embarked for the Pacific Area in January 1943. That month, Cushman was appointed commanding officer of the 2nd Battalion, 9th Marines, and in May 1943 was promoted to lieutenant colonel. During the two years he held that post, he led his battalion repeatedly into combat, earning the Bronze Star Medal with Combat "V" on Bougainville, the Navy Cross during the Battle of Guam, and the Legion of Merit with Combat "V" during the Battle of Iwo Jima, where two of his companies were nearly wiped out (10 survivors – 3 from F Company, and 7 from E Company) when they were trapped in a defilade later called "Cushman's Pocket."

Post war years

Upon his return to the United States in May 1945, Cushman was stationed at Marine Corps Schools, Quantico, for three years. During that period he completed the Senior School, served as an instructor in the Command and Staff School, and during the latter two years was supervisory instructor, Amphibious Warfare School. In June 1948, he was named head of the Amphibious Warfare Branch, Office of Naval Research, Navy Department, Washington, D.C. From October 1949 until May 1951, he served on the staff of the Central Intelligence Agency (CIA). While there, he was promoted to colonel in May 1950.

In June 1951, Cushman joined the staff of the Commander-in-Chief, United States Naval Forces, Eastern Atlantic and Mediterranean Fleet, in London, serving as amphibious plans officer until June 1953. Following his return to the United States, he was transferred to Norfolk, Virginia, where he served as a member of the faculty of the Armed Forces Staff College, and in July 1954 became director of the Plans and Operations Division there. In July 1956, he assumed command of the 2nd Marine Regiment at Camp Lejeune, North Carolina.

Assigned to Washington, D.C., in February 1957, Cushman served four years on the staff of then-Vice President Richard Nixon as assistant to the vice president for National Security Affairs. While serving in this capacity he was promoted to brigadier general in July 1958.

Following his departure from Washington, Cushman became assistant division commander, 3rd Marine Division, on Okinawa in March 1961. He was promoted to major general in August 1961, and in September assumed command of the division, when he relieved Major General Donald M. Weller.

In July 1962, Cushman reported to Headquarters Marine Corps (HQMC) in Washington, D.C., where he was assigned as both assistant chief of staff, G-2 (Intelligence) and assistant chief of staff, G-3 (Plans, Operations and Training), in which capacities he served until January 1, 1964. From that date until June 1964, he served only as assistant chief of staff, G-3.

From June 1964 until March 1967, Cushman served in the dual capacity of commanding general, Marine Corps Base Camp Pendleton, California, and commanding general, 4th Marine Division Headquarters Nucleus. In June 1966, he formed the 5th Marine Division, and additionally, he served as its commanding general at Camp Pendleton until November 1966.

Vietnam War
Cushman was ordered to the South Vietnam in April 1967 and was assigned as the deputy commander, III Marine Amphibious Force (III MAF). Upon assuming duty as commanding general, III MAF, the largest combined combat unit ever led by a Marine, he was promoted to lieutenant general in June 1967. For his service as deputy commander, from April to May 1967, and subsequently as commanding general, III MAF, from June to December 1967, he was awarded the Navy Distinguished Service Medal. A Gold Star in lieu of a second Distinguished Service Medal was awarded for his service as commanding general, III MAF; senior advisor, I Corps Tactical Zone; and I Corps coordinator for United States/Free World Military Forces, from January 1968 to March 1969.

Senior and command appointments
On March 6, 1969, while serving in Vietnam, Cushman was nominated by President Richard Nixon to be the deputy director of the Central Intelligence Agency (CIA); the Senate confirmed his nomination on April 21, 1969. Upon his return to the United States, he served briefly as director of personnel/deputy chief of staff (manpower) at HQMC. Cushman subsequently served as deputy director of the CIA from April 1969 through December 1971, for which service he was awarded the Distinguished Intelligence Medal.

Cushman was promoted to general and assumed the office of Commandant of the Marine Corps on January 1, 1972. During Cushman's tenure, he saw the last of the Marines leave Vietnam and the peacetime strength fall to 194,000 while still maintaining readiness to act in such emergencies as the Mayaguez incident and the evacuations of Phnom Penh and Saigon.

Later life
Cushman died January 2, 1985, at his home in Fort Washington, Maryland. He is buried in Arlington National Cemetery.

Awards
Cushman's medals and decorations include:

Navy Cross citation
Citation:

The President of the United States of America takes pleasure in presenting the Navy Cross to Lieutenant Colonel Robert Everton Cushman, Jr. (MCSN: 0-5062), United States Marine Corps, for extraordinary heroism as Commanding Officer of the Second Battalion, Ninth Marines, THIRD Marine Division, in action against enemy Japanese forces on Guam, Marianas Islands, from 21 July to 20 August 1944. When his Battalion was ordered to seize and hold a strongly organized and defended enemy strong point which had been holding up the advance for some days on 25 July, Lieutenant Colonel Cushman directed the attacks of his Battalion and the repulse of numerous Japanese counterattacks, fearlessly exposing himself to heavy hostile rifle, machine-gun and mortar fire in order to remain in the front lines and obtain first-hand knowledge of the enemy situation. Following three days of bitter fighting culminating in a heavy Japanese counterattack which pushed back the flank of his Battalion on 28 July, he personally led a platoon into the gap and, placing it for defense, repelled the hostile force. By his inspiring leadership, courage and devotion to duty, he contributed materially to the success of the mission with the annihilation of one enemy Battalion and the rout of another, thereby upholding the highest traditions of the United States Naval Service.

Notes

References

 
 
 

1914 births
1985 deaths
United States Marine Corps personnel of World War II
Burials at Arlington National Cemetery
People from Saint Paul, Minnesota
Deputy Directors of the Central Intelligence Agency
United States Naval Academy alumni
United States Marine Corps personnel of the Vietnam War
United States Marine Corps Commandants
United States Marine Corps generals
Attack on Pearl Harbor

Recipients of the Navy Cross (United States)
Recipients of the Navy Distinguished Service Medal
Recipients of the Legion of Merit
3 Cushman, Robert E., Jr.
Recipients of the Gallantry Cross (Vietnam)
Recipients of the Distinguished Service Order (Vietnam)
Military personnel from Minnesota